Luis Arana Goiri, self-styled as Arana ta Goiri'taŕ Koldobika (1862 in Bilbao – 1951 in Santurtzi), was a Basque nationalist politician and founder of the Basque Nationalist Party (PNV) (and creator of its flag) along with his brother Sabino Arana. He served as president of the PNV 1911?–1916, 1922–1930 (Aberri), and 1932–1933.

References

1862 births
1951 deaths
Basque Nationalist Party politicians
Flag designers
Leaders of political parties in Spain
People from Bilbao